Yomeddine (English: Judgement Day) is a 2018 Egyptian drama film directed by Abu Bakr Shawky based on friendship relations. It was selected to compete for the Palme d'Or at the 2018 Cannes Film Festival. At Cannes, it won the François Chalais Prize. It was selected as the Egyptian entry for the Best Foreign Language Film at the 91st Academy Awards, but it was not nominated.

Cast
 Rady Gamal as Beshay
 Ahmed Abdelhafiz as Obama

Reception
The film has 77% rating and an average rating 6.80/10 based  30 reviews on Rotten Tomatoes. On Metacritic the film has a weighted average score of 62 out of 100 based on 12 reviews, indicating "generally favorable reviews".

See also
 List of submissions to the 91st Academy Awards for Best Foreign Language Film
 List of Egyptian submissions for the Academy Award for Best Foreign Language Film

References

External links
 

2018 films
2018 drama films
Egyptian drama films
2010s Arabic-language films
2010s road movies